The 2007–08 Winthrop Eagles men's basketball team represented Winthrop University during the 2007–08 college basketball season. This was head coach Randy Peele's first season at Winthrop. The Eagles competed in the Big South Conference and played their home games at Winthrop Coliseum. They finished the season 22–12, 10–4 in Big South play to finish tied for first atop the conference standings. They won the 2008 Big South Conference men's basketball tournament to receive the conference's automatic bid to the 2008 NCAA Division I men's basketball tournament as No. 13 seed in the East region. They were defeated in the first round by No. 4 seed Washington State.

Roster 

Source

Schedule and results
Source
All times are Eastern

|-
!colspan=9 style=| Non-conference regular season

|-
!colspan=9 style=| Big South Regular Season

|-
!colspan=9 style=| Big South tournament

|-
!colspan=9 style=| NCAA tournament

,

References

Winthrop
Winthrop
Winthrop Eagles men's basketball seasons
Winthrop Eagles
Winthrop Eagles